CRAIC may refer to:
 China-Russia Commercial Aircraft International Co. Ltd., a joint venture established to manufacture the CRAIC CR929 airliner

See also
 Craic, a term for news, gossip, fun, entertainment, and enjoyable conversation, particularly prominent in Ireland
 The Craic,  a 1999 Australian comedy film